Carlos Moya (born 2 May 1969 in Argentina) is an Argentinean retired footballer.

References

1969 births
Living people
Argentine footballers
Godoy Cruz Antonio Tomba footballers
Boca Juniors footballers
Club Atlético Banfield footballers
Hapoel Tayibe F.C. players
Deportivo Español footballers
Ferro Carril Oeste footballers
Granada CF footballers
UD Melilla footballers
Argentine Primera División players
Liga Leumit players
Association football defenders
Argentine expatriate footballers
Expatriate footballers in Israel
Expatriate footballers in Spain
Argentine expatriate sportspeople in Israel
Argentine expatriate sportspeople in Spain